Geoffrey Feta is a Ugandan politician of the National Resistance Movement political party currently representing Ayivu East in the 11th Ugandan parliament.

In the 11th parliament Feta serves on the Committee on Information, Communication Technology and National Guidance.

References 

Living people
21st-century Ugandan politicians
National Resistance Movement politicians
Members of the Parliament of Uganda
Year of birth missing (living people)